Udaipur City Bus Depot is a Rajasthan Roadways Bus Depot in Udaipur, Rajasthan, India. It is the central bus stand for the Rajasthan State Road Transport Corporation, and have lines running for majority of other destinations in Rajasthan and farther north and west towards Madhya Pradesh and Gujarat. Major cities connected by direct bus are Delhi, Mumbai, Ahmedabad, Jaipur, Agra, Mathura, Ajmer, Jodhpur, Surat, Kota etc. There is Rajasthan Roadways Deluxe, Super deluxe and AC buses as well as private travels also available from the major cities.

See also 
 Udaipur
 Udaipur City railway station
 Udaipur Airport

References

Bus stations in Rajasthan
Buildings and structures in Udaipur
Transport in Udaipur